Renfroe is a surname of Scottish origin, and a variant of Renfrew. Notable people with the surname include:

Anita Renfroe (born 1962), American Christian comedian from Atlanta, Georgia, the wife of a Baptist pastor
Earl W. Renfroe (1907–2000), innovator in the field of orthodontics and in breaking down the barriers of racism
Gilbert Renfroe (born 1963), former professional football quarterback
Hunter Renfroe (born 1992), baseball player
Laddie Renfroe, former Major League Baseball pitcher
Leon Renfroe Meadows, the second president at East Carolina Teachers College
Marshall Renfroe (1936–1970), Major League Baseball pitcher
Moses Renfroe, one of a group of settlers who arrived in middle Tennessee in 1780 with James Robertson, the founder of Nashville
Owen Renfroe, American television soap opera director and former editor
Scott Renfroe (born 1966), legislator in the U.S. state of Colorado

See also
Renfro (surname)
Renfrow (surname)

References

Surnames of Scottish origin